John F. Kennedy Stadium may refer to:

John F. Kennedy Stadium (Bridgeport), Connecticut, United States
John F. Kennedy Stadium (Philadelphia), Pennsylvania, United States
JFK Stadium (Springfield, Missouri), United States

Buildings and structures disambiguation pages